Vladyslav Romanovych Sydorenko (born 24 October 1997) is a Ukrainian professional footballer who plays as a right-back for Ukrainian club Inhulets Petrove.

References

External links
 
 

1997 births
Living people
People from Derhachi
Ukrainian footballers
Association football defenders
FC Metalist Kharkiv players
FC Vorskla Poltava players
FC Kremin Kremenchuk players
FC Balkany Zorya players
FC Prykarpattia Ivano-Frankivsk (1998) players
FC Inhulets Petrove players
Ukrainian Premier League players
Ukrainian First League players
Ukrainian Second League players
Sportspeople from Kharkiv Oblast